Michael Greenfield (born 13 September 198) is an Australian former rugby league footballer who played 2000s and 2010s. He was a member of the Dragons' 2011 World Club Challenge-winning team.

Early life
Greenfield was born in Liverpool, New South Wales Australia, he was educated at Westfields Sports High School, where he represented 2003 Australian Schoolboys. He started playing rugby league relatively late in his life, having previously played basketball.

Michael played his junior football for Ingleburn Bulldogs.

Playing career
Greenfield started his first-grade career with the Cronulla-Sutherland Sharks, for whom he played one NRL match in 2004. He then moved to the South Sydney Rabbitohs, playing in 24 NRL matches over four seasons. He signed for the St George Illawarra Dragons from the 2010 season, and later extended his contract through the 2011 season.

Greenfield was selected to play in the 2011 World Club Challenge on 27 February 2011 at DW Stadium against the 2010 Super League premiers, Wigan Warriors. St George Illawarra Dragons went on to win the game 21–15. At the end of the 2011 season, he was released from his contract with St George and signed with Melbourne Storm.

He made his Melbourne Storm debut in round 12 of the 2012 NRL season against the Broncos. During his time at Melbourne, he suffered an injury from a shoulder charge which was bad enough to prevent him from continuing to play.

References

External links

 (archived by web.archive.org) Dragons profile
 NRL profile
 (archived by web.archive.org) NRL stats

1985 births
Living people
Australian rugby league players
Cronulla-Sutherland Sharks players
South Sydney Rabbitohs players
St. George Illawarra Dragons players
Melbourne Storm players
Shellharbour City Dragons players
North Sydney Bears NSW Cup players
Rugby league props
Rugby league players from Sydney